Bowles may refer to:

Places
Bowles, California, census-designated place in California, United States
Bowles Rocks, sandstone crag in the county of East Sussex in South East England
Cape Bowles, South Shetland Islands, Antarctica
Mount Bowles, South Shetland Islands, Antarctica

Other
Bowles (surname)
Bowles Hall, male residence dormitory at the University of California, Berkeley
Bowles v. Russell, 2007 U.S. Supreme Court case

See also
Bols (disambiguation)
Bowes (disambiguation)